The Mathematical Society of Japan (MSJ) is a learned society for mathematics in Japan.

In 1877, the organization was established as the Tokyo Sugaku Kaisha and was the first academic society in Japan. It was re-organized and re-established in its present form in 1946.

The MSJ has more than 5,000 members. They have the opportunity to participate in programs at MSJ meetings which take place in spring and autumn each year. They also have the opportunity to announce their own research at these meetings.

Prizes

Iyanaga Prize
The Iyanaga Prize was a mathematics award granted by the Mathematical Society of Japan. The prize was funded through an endowment given by Shokichi Iyanaga. Since 1988, it has been replaced by the Spring Prize.
 1973 - Yasutaka Ihara
 1974 - Reiko Sakamoto
 1975 - Motoo Takahashi
 1976 - 
 1977 - Takahiro Kawai
 1978 - Takuro Shintani
 1979 - Goro Nishida
 1980 - Katsuhiro Shiohama
 1981 - Masaki Kashiwara
 1982 - Shigeru Iitaka
 1983 - Shigefumi Mori
 1984 - Yukio Matsumoto
 1985 - Toshio Oshima
 1986 - Shinichi Kotani
 1987 - Toshikazu Sunada

Geometry Prize
The Geometry Prize is a mathematics award granted by the Mathematical Society of Japan to recognise significant or long-time research work in the field of geometry, including differential geometry, topology, and algebraic geometry. It was established in 1987.

Takebe Prize
In the context of its 50th anniversary celebrations, the Mathematical Society of Japan established the Takebe Prize for the encouragement of those who show promise as mathematicians.  The award is named after Edo period mathematician  (also known as Takebe Kenkō).

Spring Prize

Autumn Prize

English Publications from MSJ
MSJ publishes the following journals in English.
 Journal of the Mathematical Society of Japan (JMSJ)
 Japanese Journal of Mathematics (JJM)
 Publications of the Mathematical Society of Japan
 Advanced Studies in Pure Mathematics
 MSJ Memoirs

See also
 Japan Society for Industrial and Applied Mathematics
 List of mathematical societies

Notes

References
 Mathematical Society of Japan

External links
 Official website
 Geometry Prize homepage

1877 establishments in Japan
Mathematical societies
Learned societies of Japan